The Battle of the Ligurian Sea was a naval surface action of the Second World War fought on 18 March 1945, in the Gulf of Genoa in the Mediterranean Sea. The British destroyers sank two of the German ships and severely damaged the third; it was the last German naval surface action of the war.

Background
At the Malta Conference (30 January – 3 February 1945), it was decided to transfer air force and army units from Italy to the Western Front in France and Belgium in Operation Goldflake. In February and March 1945, the I Canadian Corps was moved from Italy to the French port of Marseilles. Escorts for the troopships were provided by Flank Force (Admiral Robert Jaujard) British, French and US ships, with air cover from the Mediterranean Allied Coastal Air Force (MACAF).

Prelude

On the night of 17 March 1945, the last three operational ships of the German 10th Flotilla (Korvettenkapitän Franz Burkart) conducted an offensive mine-laying operation north-east of Corsica.

In the early hours of 18 March, all but Meteor received the radar report from Livorno. Captain André Léon Jean Marie Morazzani, the senior officer aboard Tempête, ordered the British ships to intercept the intruders, while he led the older and slower French destroyers south-east, in case the Germans doubled back to intercept a convoy near Cape Corse. Lookouts commander, Derick Hetherington, coordinated with Meteor via Talk Between Ships (TBS) and the British ships went on separate courses north-east at full speed. By the time Morazzani was sure that the German ships were no threat to the convoy, he was too far away to join the action.

Action

Lookout established radar contact with the Germans at 03:00 on 18 March, sailing at  just west of north. Minutes later she swung around, moving parallel to the Germans and launched torpedoes. The Germans were surprised and Lookouts radar-directed guns quickly scored hits on TA24 and TA29. TA29 dropped out of formation while the other two ships retreated north. TA29 replied, her gunners almost hitting Lookout several times. One burst of 20 mm shells hit some smoke floats and started a small fire that was quickly extinguished.

Lookout continued to fire at TA29 until just after 04:00; after more than 40 hits, TA29 caught fire and sank. She lost only 20 men despite Lookouts intense and accurate salvos. Seeing the hit in the dark, she launched a salvo of torpedoes a few minutes later, one of which struck TA24. Meteors commander, Richard Pankhurst, saw a "geyser of flame and metal" and TA24 sank just after 04:00, losing thirty men in 13 minutes.

Aftermath
The British destroyers ended any possibility of German deep water offensive operations in the Ligurian Sea, let alone anywhere else in the Mediterranean. The engagement was also the last surface naval action the British fought in the western theatre and the last substantial surface action fought on the Mediterranean Sea. TA32 was damaged but managed to escape; she was scuttled by her crew in Genoa on 25 April 1945. The British destroyers rescued 244 survivors, including Franz Burkart, in rafts and boats from TA24 and TA29 and took them prisoner. In 2011, Spencer Tucker wrote that "the British destroyers achieved decisive results against a German unit... and their victory effectively ended the Kriegsmarine's ability to undertake deep water offensive operations".

References

Bibliography

Further reading

External links
 HMS Lookout (G 32) – U-Boat.net
  Service Histories of Royal Navy ships in WWII – HMS Meteor (G 73) (M-class Destroyer)

Ligurian Sea
Battle of the Ligurian Sea
Ligurian Sea
Ligurian Sea
Ligurian Sea
Ligurian Sea
March 1945 events in Europe
1945 in France
1945 in Italy